Quebec Arena was an indoor ice hockey arena in Quebec City, Quebec.  It was built in 1913 and was the home of the Quebec Bulldogs of the NHA and NHL until the team moved to Hamilton, Ontario in 1920.  It was located at Victoria Park. It burned down in 1942.

History
In 1913, after their second Stanley Cup win in the old Quebec Skating Rink, the Quebec Hockey Club proposed to build a new facility. With the support of Quebec City Council, a new arena was built in Victoria Park by a group headed by Joseph-Etienne Dussault. The 6,000 seat venue opened for its first game in December 1913.

References

External links
Program from 1915 game at arena

Defunct indoor ice hockey venues in Canada
Defunct indoor arenas in Canada
Defunct National Hockey League venues
Sports venues completed in 1913
Sports venues in Quebec City
1913 establishments in Quebec
Quebec Bulldogs
Sports venues demolished in 1942
1942 disestablishments in Quebec